Ventral anterior homeobox 1 is a protein that in humans is encoded by the VAX1 gene.

Function 

This gene appears to influence the development in humans of the forebrain. It is also present in mice and xenopus frogs, which suggests a long evolutionary history, and in those organisms its expression is confined to the forebrain, optic and olfactory areas.

VAX1 gene is a transcription factor that has a homeodomain located in the 100-159 amino acid position and an Ala–rich region located in 216-253 amino acid position of the gene. Expression studies in mice show that it is expressed in the palate, coloboma in the visual system, and the basal telencephalon, optic stalk, and visual eye fields where it is expressed along with the Shh and Bmp4 genes.

Clinical significance 

Mice with homozygous VAX1 mutations have been reported to display craniofacial malformations including cleft palate.

Genome Wide Association Studies (GWAS) reported significant associations between non-syndromic clefts and SNPs in the VAX1 gene. Replication studies have confirmed these associations in different population groups

References

Further reading

External links 
 
 

Transcription factors